Farrell Haliday "Rusty" Draper (January 25, 1923 – March 28, 2003) was an American country and pop singer-songwriter and radio and TV host who achieved his greatest success in the 1950s.

Biography
Born in Kirksville, Missouri, United States, and nicknamed "Rusty" for his red hair, he began performing on his uncle's radio show in Tulsa, Oklahoma in the mid-1930s.  Draper moved on to work at radio stations in Des Moines, Iowa—sometimes filling in for sports announcer Ronald Reagan—and in Illinois before settling in California.  There, he began to sing in local clubs, becoming resident singer at the Rumpus Room in San Francisco.  By the early 1950s, he had begun appearing on national TV shows, including The Ed Sullivan Show (CBS) and Ozark Jubilee (ABC).

In 1952, Draper signed to Mercury Records and issued his debut single, "How Could You (Blue Eyes)".  The following year, after a national club tour, his cover version of Jim Lowe's "Gambler's Guitar" made number six on both the country and pop charts, and sold a million copies, and was awarded a gold disc.  After a series of less successful follow-ups, he made the national charts again in 1955 with "Seventeen" (number 18), "The Shifting, Whispering Sands" (number three, another million-seller), and "Are You Satisfied?" (number 11), becoming one of the biggest pop and country crossover stars of the period.

In 1956, he returned to the top 20 with "In The Middle Of the House" (number 20), followed up by his version of Chas McDevitt’s UK skiffle hit, "Freight Train" (number six). Draper also reached the UK Singles Chart with a rendition of "Mule Skinner Blues".

In 1962, he left Mercury to sign with Monument Records, with diminishing chart success as his style became more old-fashioned, but he continued to have minor hits in the country chart through the 1960s.  He remained a steady concert draw in years to follow, and also appeared in stage musicals and on television, including his duties as one of the hosts of NBC's short-lived 1966 daytime TV series Swingin' Country.

Draper died of pneumonia in Bellevue, Washington, at the age of 80.

Singles

 A " Mule Skinner Blues " also peaked at #39 on UK Singles Charts

References

External links

1923 births
2003 deaths
American country singer-songwriters
American male singer-songwriters
Country musicians from Missouri
People from Kirksville, Missouri
Mercury Records artists
Monument Records artists
Deaths from pneumonia in Washington (state)
20th-century American singers
Singer-songwriters from Missouri
20th-century American male singers